Salto is a municipality in the state of São Paulo in Brazil. It is part of the Metropolitan Region of Sorocaba. The population is 119,736 (2020 est.) in an area of 133.06 km². The elevation is 555 m. The city has one main river, rio Tietê. The city has an important geological park, the Moutonée Park.

References